Bread pakora is an Indian and Pakistani fried snack (pakora or fritter). It is also known as bread bhaji (or bajji). A common street food, it is made from bread slices, gram flour, and spices among other ingredients.

The snack is prepared by dipping triangular bread slices in spicy gram flour batter and frying them. Stuffing such as mashed potatoes is common. It can be deep-fried or pan-fried, and is served with chutneys or ketchup.

Preparation 
Bread pakora is made by frying a slice of bread in a spiced batter. The batter is made by mixing gram flour and spices. The bread is then dipped into the batter and fried. When one side is golden-brown, the bread is flipped and fried on the other side. Bread pakora is often served with chutney, like tamarind or cilantro-lime.

Variation
One variation of bread pakora is adding mashed potatoes to create a sandwich with two slices of bread and then frying it.

See also

References 

Indian snack foods
Pakistani snack foods
Indo-Caribbean cuisine
Deep fried foods
Bread dishes